The border beaked gecko (Rhynchoedura angusta) is a gecko endemic to Australia.

References

Rhynchoedura
Reptiles described in 2011
Taxa named by Mitzy Pepper
Taxa named by Paul Doughty
Taxa named by Mark Norman Hutchinson
Taxa named by J. Scott Keogh
Geckos of Australia